Ekta Chowdhry is the winner of Pantaloons Femina Miss India Universe 2009 title. She is the daughter of Delhi's first chief minister Chaudhary Brahm Prakash Yadav.

Femina Miss India Universe
Chowdhry was crowned the winner of the Femina Miss India Universe title on 5 April 2009 at the Andheri Sports Complex in Mumbai.

Miss Universe 2009
Chowdhry represented India at the Miss Universe 2009 competition on 23 August 2009 in Nassau, Bahamas but failed to make the final cut as one of the top 15 contestants. She has returned to India to continue her journey as Miss India Universe.

References

Living people
Miss Universe 2009 contestants
Femina Miss India winners
Female models from Uttar Pradesh
1986 births